Vanashen is a village in the Vedi Municipality of the Ararat Province of Armenia.  Before 1978, it was known as Taytan.

It is one of the sites of the USAID Community Partnership for Health program.

See also
 Ararat Province

References

External links 

Populated places in Ararat Province